Dance Hub SA, formerly Leigh Warren & Dancers or Leigh Warren + Dancers (LWD) and then LWDance Hub, is a contemporary dance company based in the South Australian capital of Adelaide. Formed in 1993 by Leigh Warren, the company toured internationally and won several awards.

In its 2019 incarnation as Dance Hub SA, it has increasingly taken on the role of peak body within the state, playing an advocacy and education role for dancers and choreographers. It is a community space for both emerging and established artists, with a program that includes artists-in-residence and an international exchange program.

History

1993: creation
The dance troupe was formed in 1993 by Leigh Warren (formerly of the Australian Dance Theatre), named Leigh Warren + Dancers, which moved into the loft studio of the newly-created Lion Arts Centre, on the corner of North Terrace and Morphett Street, Adelaide.

2011: loss of funding
The company lost its funding from the Australia Council as well as a guarantee of similar funding from Arts SA in 2011, leaving it to rely on major sponsors and benefactors and smaller funding bodies.

2014: New director?

In 2014, Warren handed over the reigns first as resident choreographer, then (in 2015) as artistic director to the 28-year-old dancer and choreographer Daniel Jaber, who, like Warren, had established his skills with the Australian Dance Theatre. His work was in contemporary ballet rather than contemporary dance, but he hoped to "present everything from super experimental work to the high gloss stuff". He had considered changing the company’s name from Leigh Warren Dance (sic) to Daniel Jaber Dance in the future, but thinks it is more likely that LWD would remain in any change of name.)

However, only a year later came the news that Jaber had departed for Los Angeles and that LWD would be transformed into a dance hub, "a dedicated dance arts venue and incubator that supports and develops mid career, independent and emerging artists". Jaber cited lack of funding as the main reason for his departure: the Australia Council triennial funding had expired in 2012, and the company had been surviving on project grants ever since. There were other reasons too, some personal, but he was working on forming a new company which would work across international borders. Jaber pointed to some successful developments at the company under his management – workshops and masterclasses with some of the best dancers from around the country, and the establishment of an education and community program and the appointment of an education manager, Kialea-Nadine Williams.

2016: LWDance Hub
With the competitive dance industry competing over support for the independent dance sector and the failed future artistic director of the Leigh Warren Dancers Company. In 2016, Warren reshaped the company to accommodate the reduced funding, rebranding it as LWDance Hub, relying on residencies, workshops and open house sessions for performers and choreographers to hone their skills. This was also to maintain the studio space that is government funded that has now been taken over by State Theater. 

From early 2018 through to July 2019, the LWDance Hub supported 33 creative endeavours, presented 25 new works for the Adelaide Fringe and SALA Festival, and had 200 artists take part in its programs.

2019: Dance Hub SA
In July 2019, Warren handed over the artistic directorship to choreographer and multimedia artist Amanda Phillips, at the same time renaming the company Dance Hub South Australia (later changing this to Dance Hub SA, with Warren staying on as patron).

Dance Hub SA was officially launched in August 2019, with the rebranding reinforcing the organisation as the peak body for dance in the state. This was in competition between The Australian Dance Theater International Choreographic Center that focuses on supporting the imported company members as the independent sector and The Mill who was funded after dismantling Ausdance SA. The Hub is intended as a hierarchical community space for selected emerging AC Arts graduates, established dancers and selected choreographers. With one of its goals being for it to be the bridge and replication between formal education and "the real world" based on the exploitation of artist other than those selected in the hierarchy, creating another pathway (outside of ADT dance company) for choreographers who are creative producers. The "Mind The Gap" residency program is a partnership with Tasmanian company TasDance, and the Artist in Residence program.  The inaugural artist on a new international exchange program would be Wu Chien-Wei, from Taiwan’s Tussock Dance Theatre.

Dance works that were not a part of the Dance HuB SA and are formally a part of Leigh Warren's Company

 Quiver (1997 in Adelaide and Canberra; 1998 in Brisbane)
 Shimmer (1999 – toured widely in Australia; also filmed for ABC TV)
 Masterpieces of the 20th C (1999)
 Silent Cries (1999)
 Wanderlust: a collaboration with Japanese choreographer Uno Man (2007)
 Frame and Circle: Choreographers: Prue Lang Rubicon and Leigh Warren Meridian (2010 at The Space in the Adelaide Festival Centre)
 Dreamscape, consisting of two works: Dream Time: (previously choreographed by Jiri Kylian, premiered in 1983) and Escape (choreographed by Leigh Warren and Kaiji Moriyama (2011; part of the 5th OzAsia Festival, and with music by Simon Tedeschi)

 Quick Brown Fox: a collaboration with William Forsythe (for the 2001 Melbourne Festival)
 Petroglyths — Signs of Life: a collaboration with Gina Rings (2005 & 2008)
 medico manouevres (2007 & 2009)
 Seven (2008)
 Astor Piazzolla's Maria de Buenos Aires with State Opera of South Australia (2010)
 The Philip Glass Trilogy, first separately, and then in its entirety (August 2014, at Her Majesty's Theatre, Adelaide, choreographed by Warren)
 Akhnaten (also on its own in 2002 in Adelaide and 2003 in Melbourne)
Einstein on the Beach (also on its own in 2006 at the Festival Theatre, Adelaide, in the Festival Centre)
Satyagraha (also on its own in 2007 at the Dunstan Playhouse in the Festival Centre)
 Reassessment: (August 2014, Adelaide Festival Centre, choreographed by Daniel Jaber)

Awards

1997 – Inaugural Adelaide Critics' Circle Award
Best Performance by a Group — LWD for Quiver

1999 – Australian Dance Awards
Outstanding Performance by a Dance Company — for Masterpieces of the 20thC
Best Choreography — Leigh Warren for Shimmer
Outstanding Performance by an Individual Dance Artist — Delia Silvan for Silent Cries

2000 – The Sidney Myer Performing Arts Awards
Group Award Winner

2001 – Green Room Award 
Best Female Performer — Rachel Jenson for Quick Brown Fox
Best Male Performer — Peter Furness for Quick Brown Fox
Best Ensemble — Quick Brown Fox

2002 – Adelaide Critics' Circle
Commendation for Akhnaten

2003 – Green Room Award
Best Dance Ensemble — for Akhnaten

2004 – Adelaide Critics' Circle
Individual Award — Leigh Warren for Einstein on the Beach (Parts 3 & 4)

2005 – Adelaide Critics' Circle
Innovation Award — Leigh Warren and Gina Rings for Petroglyphs — Signs of Life

2010 – Australia Business Arts Foundation (AbaF) inaugural Arts & Health Foundation Award
Leigh Warren & Dancers with the Flinders Medical Centre for medico manouevres

In film
A number of dancers from the company performed in the film The Diaries of Vaslav Nijinsky (2001), made by Paul Cox.

References

Further reading
 (archived 2012)
 (on the occasion of Warren's Lifetime Achievement Award)

External links
 

Dance companies in Australia
Contemporary dance companies
Performing arts in Adelaide
1993 establishments in Australia
Dance schools in Australia